XHSCA-FM is a radio station on 93.3 FM in Cananea, Sonora. It is owned by Radio Grupo OIR and carries a romantic music format known as La Consentida.

History
XHSCA received its concession on November 16, 1988; the concession was originally awarded to María Trinidad Aguirre Gómez.

References

Radio stations in Sonora